Rabbitt Island is a small island in Wickford Harbor, Narragansett Bay, Wickford, Rhode Island. Roger Williams received the island from Chief Canonicus' wife as a gift for a place to raise his goats.  Richard Smith, who built Smith's Castle, later owned the island.

References

External links
Islands of Narragansett Bay
Frederic Denlson, Narragansett Sea and Shore, (J.A. & R.A. Reid, Providence, RI., 1879)
George L. Seavey, Rhode Island's Coastal Natural Areas.

Islands of Washington County, Rhode Island
Islands of Narragansett Bay
Islands of Rhode Island